Auto Raja may refer to:
 Auto Raja (1980 film)
 Auto Raja (1982 film)
 Auto Raja (2013 film)
 T. Raja, an Indian humanitarian popularly known as Auto Raja